Garrett John Hedlund (born September 3, 1984) is an American actor. His films include Troy (2004), Friday Night Lights (2004), Four Brothers (2005), Eragon (2006), Death Sentence (2007), Tron: Legacy (2010), Country Strong (2010), On the Road (2012), Inside Llewyn Davis (2013), Unbroken (2014), Pan (2015), Mudbound (2017) and Triple Frontier (2019).

Early life
Garrett John Hedlund was born on September 3, 1984, in Roseau, Minnesota, to Kristine Anne (née Yanish) and Robert Martin Hedlund. His father is of Swedish descent and his mother is of Norwegian and German descent. He is the youngest of three children, with a brother, Nathaniel, and a sister, Amanda.

Hedlund was raised on a remote beef cattle farm near the small town of Wannaska, Minnesota in the Scandinavian diaspora.

In the 9th grade, he moved to live with his mother in Arizona. From an early age, he has had a great fondness for reading. During his school years he participated in ice hockey, track and field, wrestling, and American football. In Arizona he saved his tips from working as a waiter to pay for lessons with acting coach Jean Fowler, with whom he worked on speeches and script material.

Six months after graduating from Horizon High School, he moved to Los Angeles.

Career

2003–2009: Early work and breakthrough 

In 2003, Hedlund moved to Los Angeles to pursue his acting career. As a teenager, Hedlund modeled for L.L. Bean and Teen Magazine.

At the age of nineteen, Hedlund made his debut in his first feature film playing Patroclus who was the younger cousin of Achilles played by Brad Pitt in the mythological epic adventure war drama Troy, directed by Wolfgang Petersen. The film was released on May 14, 2004.

That same year, he also co-starred with Billy Bob Thornton, Amber Heard and Tim McGraw as Don Billingsley in the 2004 sports drama Friday Night Lights, where McGraw played his abusive father. In 2005, he co-starred with Mark Wahlberg, Tyrese Gibson and André Benjamin  in the crime drama Four Brothers as Jack Mercer.

He co-starred with Ed Speleers, Jeremy Irons, Djimon Hounsou and John Malkovich in the fantasy-adventure film Eragon as Murtagh Morzansson. This 20th Century Fox film is an international co-production between United States, United Kingdom and Hungary. In October 2006, it was announced that the actors from the Eragon film would lend their voices to the game adaptation. Hedlund lends his image and voice to his character Murtagh in the video game Eragon.

In 2007, he co-starred with Lindsay Lohan, Jane Fonda and Felicity Huffman in the comedy Georgia Rule, directed by Garry Marshall. That same year, he co-starred with Kevin Bacon in the crime thriller Death Sentence, directed by James Wan. In this film Hedlund plays the main villain Billy Darley.

2010–2012: Tron: Legacy and worldwide recognition 

In 2010, Hedlund plays Sam Flynn the main protagonist in the science fiction/action film Tron: Legacy, acting alongside Jeff Bridges and Olivia Wilde. Hedlund won a "Darwinian casting process" which tested hundreds of actors, being chosen for having the "unique combination of intelligence, wit, humor, look and physicality" that the producers were looking for in Flynn's son. Hedlund trained hard to do his own stunts, which included jumping over cars and copious wire and harness work. The film was released on December 17, 2010, and directed by Joseph Kosinski. It is a sequel to the 1982 film Tron, whose director Steven Lisberger returned to produce. Like its predecessor, Tron: Legacy has also been described as a cult film. Hedlund was also considered by Disney to play Captain America / Steve Rogers in the Marvel Cinematic Universe, but had to abandon the project because his film schedule got in the way of Tron: Legacy.

Hedlund co-starred with Gwyneth Paltrow, Leighton Meester and his Friday Night Lights co-star, country musician Tim McGraw in the musical drama Country Strong, which was released on December 22, 2010. He recorded a number of songs for the film including "Chances Are" which appeared on Country Strong: Original Motion Picture Soundtrack. His performance was well received by critics. Noting voice similarities between Hedlund and Charlie Robison, Roughstock said "the best song on this album belongs to him" and Country Weekly wrote that of all the songs performed by actors in this film, his was "the most convincing". Six other songs, including a duet with Meester, were featured on a second soundtrack titled Country Strong: More Music from the Motion Picture. 

On June 7, 2011, Hedlund was named "Man of the Year" at the Glamour Awards.

He also co-starred with Kristen Stewart, Sam Riley, Kirsten Dunst and Viggo Mortensen as Dean Moriarty in the 2012 adventure drama On the Road, produced by Francis Ford Coppola. The film was directed by Walter Salles and based on Jack Kerouac's novel of same name. That same year, he was an advertising and catwalk model for the Italian fashion firm Prada. 

Hedlund was cast as Kaneda Shotaro in the live-action version of Akira but production of the film was cancelled. Hedlund reportedly turned down the roles of Christian Grey in the film adaptation of E. L. James' best-selling novel Fifty Shades of Grey and Finnick Odair in the sequel to the dystopian science fiction/adventure film The Hunger Games titled The Hunger Games: Catching Fire.

2013–present: Established actor 

In 2013, Hedlund co-starred with Oscar Isaac, Justin Timberlake and Adam Driver in the French-American black comedy-drama film Inside Llewyn Davis, directed by Joel and Ethan Coen. Hedlund pays homage to a fallen cowboy whose name is Lane Frost in the music video of the song Beautiful War by American rock band Kings of Leon. Also in 2013, he was the image of Yves Saint Laurent Beauté's French men's fragrance "La Nuit de l'Homme".

He starred in the drama film Lullaby in 2014, directed by Andrew Levitas. In this film Hedlund sings the main musical theme. That same year, he co-starred with Jack O'Connell and Domhnall Gleeson in the historical drama Unbroken, directed by Angelina Jolie.

Hedlund played James Hook (future Captain Hook) in the film Pan in 2015, co-starring alongside Hugh Jackman, Rooney Mara and Levi Miller, directed by Joe Wright. In September of that same year, Hedlund wrote the book The Art of Pan with Joe Wright and Christopher Grove.

He co-starred with Joe Alwyn and Vin Diesel in the 2016 film war drama film Billy Lynn's Long Halftime Walk, directed by Ang Lee.

In 2017, he co-starred with Carey Mulligan in the film Mudbound, directed by Dee Rees. Also that same year, he co-starred with Sharon Stone as an aspiring artist in Steven Soderbergh's HBO murder mystery drama series Mosaic. It was released in two forms: as an iOS/Android mobile app and as a television drama. In 2018, Hedlund produced and starred alongside Juno Temple in the short film Tocsin filmed in Cayman Islands and directed by Frank E. Flowers. That same year, he starred Burden as Mike Burden, in this dramatic film inspired by true events Hedlund acted alongside Forest Whitaker and Usher. 

He co-starred with Ben Affleck, Oscar Isaac, Charlie Hunnam, and Pedro Pascal in the action-adventure film, released by Netflix in 2019 and directed by J. C. Chandor, Triple Frontier recorded between Soacha and Bogotá, where he plays a former Special Forces Soldier in a particular mercenary operation in South America. That same year, he co-stars with Kelly Macdonald in the romantic drama film Dirt Music, directed by Gregor Jordan. This film is a United Kingdom / Australian co-production and is based on the novel of the same name by Tim Winton; Hedlund recorded a number of songs for the film. In August 2020, a "Dirt Music" soundtrack album (featuring music from the film) was released as a digital download.

Hedlund portrayed controversial U.S. government official Harry J. Anslinger in the biographical film The United States vs. Billie Holiday in 2021, directed by Lee Daniels; Anslinger was actually in his mid 50s to 60s during the setting of the film. In September 2021, he stars in the first Stephen King podcast titled Strawberry Spring. Hedlund's first single not associated with an acting role, "The Road", was digitally released on January 21, 2022. This same year, he co-starred with Sylvester Stallone in the Paramount+ series Tulsa King, playing bartender and ex-bull rider Mitch Keller.

Personal life

Hedlund is a skilled guitarist and violinist. During the filming of Eragon in Slovakia, his co-star Jeremy Irons was his personal instructor in the development of alternative violin techniques.

Relationships 
From 2012 to 2016, Hedlund was in a relationship with his On the Road co-star Kirsten Dunst.

In March 2019, Hedlund began a relationship with actress Emma Roberts. In August 2020, it was announced that the couple were expecting their first child, a son. Roberts gave birth to their son on December 27, 2020. Country singer and actor Tim McGraw is godfather to Hedlund's son. In January 2022, it was announced that Hedlund and Roberts had split.

Filmography

Film

Television

Podcasts

Video games

Music videos

Discography

Soundtrack Country Strong

Soundtrack Dirt Music

Other songs

Chart history
Hedlund's duet with Meester—"Give in to Me"— was the only song to chart as a single, reaching No. 79 on the Billboard Hot 100 and No. 96 on the Canadian Hot 100.

Awards and nominations

References

External links

 
 
 
 

1984 births
Living people
American people of Scandinavian descent
People from Roseau, Minnesota
Male actors from Minnesota
American male film actors
American male stage actors
21st-century American male actors
21st-century American singers
21st-century American male singers